Timothy Anjembe (born 20 September 1987 in Gboko) is a retired Nigerian footballer who played as a striker.

Career
In 2005, Timothy signed for Lobi Stars, where he became top scorer of the Nigerian Premier League, the top tier of Nigeria, at the age of 18 and was considered one of the hottest prospects in the league. A year later, he joined Enyimba and played at the CAF Champions League.

Timothy then went to Vietnam to join Vissai Ninh Bình in 2009. He was loaned out to Đồng Tháp and scored a hat-trick in his debut against Hoàng Anh Gia Lai. At the end of the season, he was nominated as one of the best foreigners in the league. In 2010, Timothy joined Hòa Phát Hà Nội.

References

1987 births
Living people
Nigerian footballers
Association football forwards
Expatriate footballers in Vietnam
Enyimba F.C. players
Nigerian expatriate sportspeople in Vietnam
Dong Thap FC players
Nigerian expatriate footballers
Lobi Stars F.C. players
Nigeria Professional Football League players
BCC Lions F.C. players
People from Gboko
Zamfara United F.C. players